Ryan Penn (born April 6, 1988) is a Bahamian sprinter from Freeport, Bahamas who competed in the 100m and 200. He attended Grand Bahama Catholic High School in Freeport, Bahamas, before going on to compete for Southwestern Christian College and Louisiana State University.

He won a bronze medal on the  relay at the 2005 CARIFTA Games in Tobago. He Also ran the 100m at the 2006 CARIFTA Games where he placed 8th in the 100m after suffering muscle cramps. He then placed 6th in the 100m at the 2006 Central American and Caribbean Junior Championships.
Penn also competed at the 2005 World Youth Championships in Athletics and the 2005 Pan American Junior Athletics Championships.

In 2012 Penn competed in the IAAF World Challenge Grande Prêmio Brasil Caixa de Atletismo in Rio de Janeiro, Brazil. He ran the anchor leg of the 4x100m relay in a time of 39.36.

Personal bests

References

External links
 World Athletics
 LSU

1988 births
Living people
Bahamian male sprinters
People from Freeport, Bahamas
LSU Tigers track and field athletes
Junior college men's track and field athletes in the United States